Rage On is the seventh studio album by American country music artist Dan Seals. The album charted at number 6 on the Top Country Albums chart, his second highest charting album since Won't Be Blue Anymore in 1985. The Singles released were "Addicted", "Big Wheels In The Moonlight", and "They Rage On"; the first two both went to Number One on Hot Country Songs and the title track peaked at number five on the same chart.

Brian Mansfield gave the album four-and-a-half stars out of five in his review for Allmusic, saying that the songs were "woven around traditional country themes while rarely resorting to country clichés."

Track listing

Personnel
As listed in liner notes.

Musicians
 Baillie & the Boys (Kathie Baillie, Michael Bonagura, Alan LeBoeuf) – background vocals
 Eddie Bayers – drums
 Mike Brignardello – bass guitar
 Dennis Burnside – acoustic piano, electric piano
 Larry Byrom – acoustic guitar
 Mark Casstevens – acoustic guitar
 Paul Franklin – steel guitar
 Steve Gibson – acoustic guitar, electric guitar
 Doyle Grisham – steel guitar
 Jim Horn – recorder
 David Hungate – bass guitar
 Shane Keister – acoustic piano, keyboards, synthesizer
 Mike Lawler – keyboards, drum machine
 Paul Leim – drums
 Larrie Londin – drums
 Brent Mason – electric rhythm guitar
Terry McMillan – percussion
 Kenny Mims – electric guitar, electric rhythm guitar
 Mark O'Connor – fiddle, mandolin
 Don Potter – acoustic guitar
 Dan Seals – vocals, acoustic guitar
 Joe Stanley – electric guitar
 Billy Joe Walker Jr. – electric guitar, electric rhythm guitar
 Jack Williams – bass guitar

Technical
 Joe Bogan – engineer
 Larry Dixon – photography
 Jerry Joyner – design
 Kyle Lehning – producer, engineer
 Simon Levy – art direction 
 Keith Odle – assistant engineer
 Kirt Odle – assistant engineer
 Doug Sax – mastering

Charts

Weekly charts

Year-end charts

Singles

References

1988 albums
Dan Seals albums
Capitol Records albums
Albums produced by Kyle Lehning